Ahmad Nazir Safi (born January 21, 1983) is an Afghan footballer who plays for 1. FCA Darmstadt.

National team statistics

External links
 

Afghan footballers
Afghan expatriate footballers
1983 births
Living people
Association football midfielders
Afghanistan international footballers